The Schärhorn is a mountain in the Glarus Alps near Klausen Pass. The highest summit is named Gross Schärhorn (3,297 m) while a second summit is named Chli Schärhorn (3,232 m). The mountain overlooks the valley of Schächental to the north side, and the Hüfifirn to the southeast, which finally leads to the Maderanertal to the southwest. Both valleys are located in the canton of Uri.

References

External links
Schärhorn on Summitpost
Schärhorn on Hikr

Mountains of the Alps
Alpine three-thousanders
Mountains of Switzerland
Mountains of the canton of Uri